Yingli College, Longleng, is a general degree college in Longleng, Nagaland. It offers undergraduate courses in arts and is affiliated to Nagaland University. This college was established in 1992.

Departments

Arts
English 
History 
Political Science 
Sociology
Economics
Education

Accreditation
The college is recognized by the University Grants Commission (UGC).

References

External links
http://www.yinglicollege.in/

Colleges affiliated to Nagaland University
Universities and colleges in Nagaland
Educational institutions established in 1992
1992 establishments in Nagaland